Thomas Forrester (16 May 1838 – 25 March 1907) was a New Zealand plasterer, draughtsman, architect and engineer. He was born in Glasgow, Lanarkshire, Scotland on 16 May 1838. In 1865, he was the building superintendent at the New Zealand Exhibition in Dunedin.

References

1838 births
1907 deaths
19th-century New Zealand architects
20th-century New Zealand architects
19th-century New Zealand engineers
20th-century New Zealand engineers